College Sports Communicators (CSC), known before the 2022–23 school year as the College Sports Information Directors of America (CoSIDA), is an organization that focuses on professional development and support for sports information directors at all levels. It offers awards, scholarships, and grants in support of SIDs and prospective SIDs in the industry. Since 1952, CSC has bestowed Academic All-American recognition on male and female athletes in Divisions I, II, and III of the National Collegiate Athletic Association (NCAA)—covering all NCAA championship sports—and NAIA athletes.

History
CSC began as a part of the American College Public Relations Association (ACPRA). It split and was established as a separate organization for sports information directors in 1957 as College Sports Information Directors of America (CoSIDA). The organizatiom holds an annual conference based around professional development. The first conference was held in Chicago in 1957, where there were 102 attendees. As of 2019 there are over 3,100 members in the United States and Canada.

In 2008, CoSIDA launched a strategic plan to change the image and focus of the organization. Part of the plan was to modify the traditional "Sports Information Director" job title to "Strategic Communicator". Along with this, CoSIDA changed its logo and began to work with the National Association of Collegiate Directors of Athletics (NACDA). Another key point was to have members get better at effective communication strategy, specifically strategic communication. This change is in response to changes in media technology, namely social media.

The organization's name was changed to College Sports Communicators on September 1, 2022.

CSC's Research on Social Media 
A 2012 study, conducted by G. Clayton Stoldt of Wichita State University, surveyed 529 CoSIDA members on how social media had impacted their institutions. Some key results are:

 92% said that social media changed how their institution communicates
 89% said social media changed how they handle external communications
 81% agreed that social media has in some way enhanced public relations practices
 92% said that social media impacts mainstream media
 92% also said social media has forced organizations to respond more quickly to crises
 69% said that social media is less accurate than traditional media, 72% said social media is less credible than traditional media
 75% said that social media impacts organizations' transparency
 Only 6% knew of any time their institution managed social media based on legality

A separate study in 2016, conducted by CoSIDA and researched by Katelyn Miller of Rutgers University, found that just 33% of institutions had implemented a social media policy and 50% of SIDs had, on at least one occasion, deleted a social media post from a coach or student-athlete.

Academic All-American Selections 
Since 1952, CSC has selected Academic All-Americans for NCAA Division I, NCAA Division II, NCAA Division III and NAIA. In 2018-19, two-year schools and Canadian institutions were made eligible for at-large All-American selections. The award currently has no corporate sponsor; past sponsors include GTE, Verizon, ESPN The Magazine, Capital One, and Google Cloud.

CSC is responsible for the annual selection of 816 Academic All-Americans in men's soccer, football, basketball, baseball and track and field/cross country and women's soccer, volleyball, basketball, softball, and track and field/cross country. The sports that CSC recognizes as eligible for at-large Academic All-American recognition are:

Dick Enberg Award Winners
The organization presents the annual Dick Enberg Award to a "person whose actions and commitment have furthered the meaning and reach of the Academic All-America Teams Program and/or the student athlete while promoting the values of education and academics." Frank Beamer has been selected as the 2019 recipient.

2019: Frank Beamer, Virginia Tech
2018: Bill Walton, UCLA
2017: Dr. Robert Khayat, University of Mississippi
2016: Roger Staubach, NFL Hall of Fame 
2015: Andre Agassi, Tennis Hall of Fame
2014: Ann Meyers Drysdale, UCLA
2013: Mike Krzyzewski, Duke
2012: Joe Paterno, The Pennsylvania State University
2011: Jackie Joyner-Kersee, UCLA
2010: Tom Hansen, Pacific-10 Conference
2009: Steve Smith, Michigan State
2008: Chuck Lee, Verizon
2007: Pat Summitt, Tennessee
2006: President Gerald Ford, Michigan
2005: Father Theodore Hesburgh, Notre Dame
2004: Ted Leland, Stanford
2003: Tom Osborne, Nebraska
2002: Alan Page, Notre Dame
2001: Donna Shalala, U. of Miami, Fla.
2000: Bill Russell, San Francisco
1999: Dean Smith, North Carolina
1998: John Humenik, CoSIDA
1997: Dick Enberg

Presidents 
The following is a listing of past presidents:

2018-19: Rob Knox, Towson
2017-18: Rob Carolla, College Football 150
2016-17: Andy Seely, Central Florida
2015-16: Judy Willson, Mountain West Conference
2014-15: Eric McDowell, Union College (N.Y.)
2013-14: Shelly Poe, Auburn
2012-13: Joe Hornstein, FIU
2011-12: Tom Di Camillo, Pacific West Conference & Central Arizona College
2010-11: Larry Dougherty, Temple
2009-10: Justin Doherty, Wisconsin
2008-09: Nick Joos, Baylor
2007-08: Charles Bloom, Southeastern Conference
2006-07: Doug Dull, Maryland
2005-06: Joe Hernandez, Ball State
2004-05: Rod Commons, Washington State
2003-04: Tammy Boclair, Vanderbilt
2002-03: Alan Cannon, Texas A&M
2001-02: Pete Moore, Syracuse
2000-01: Fred Stabley Jr., Central Michigan
1999-00: Max Corbet, Boise State
1998-99: Maxey Parrish, Baylor 
1997-98: Pete Kowalski, Rutgers
1996-97: Jim Vruggink, Purdue
1995-96: Rick Brewer, North Carolina
1994-95: Hal Cowan, Oregon State
1993-94: Doug Vance, Kansas
1992-93: Ed Carpenter, Boston University
1991-92: George Wine, Iowa
1990-91: June Stewart, Vanderbilt
1989-90: Arnie Sgalio, Big Sky Conference
1988-89: Bill Little, Texas
1987-88: Bob Smith, Rutgers 
1986-87: Roger Valdiserri, Notre Dame
1985-86: Jack Zane, Maryland
1984-85: Nordy Jenson, Western Athletic Conference
1983-84: Bill Whitmore, Rice
1982-83: Howie Davis, Massachusetts
1981-82: Nick Vista, Michigan State
1980-81: Langston Rogers, Delta State
1979-80: Dave Schulthess, Brigham Young
1978-79: Don Bryant, Nebraska
1977-78: Bob Peterson, Minnesota
1976-77: Bill Esposito, St. John’s
1975-76: Bob Bradley, Clemson
1974-75: Hal Bateman, Air Force
1973-74: Jones Ramsey, Texas
1972-73: Jim Mott, Wisconsin
1971-72: Dick Page, Massachusetts
1970-71: Elmore Hudgins, Southeastern Conference
1969-70: Harry Burrell, Iowa State
1968-69: Tom Miller, Indiana
1967-68: Bill Young, Wyoming
1966-67: Marvin Francis, Wake Forest
1965-66: Bob Culp, Western Michigan
1965-66: Val Pinchbeck, Syracuse
1964-65: Harold Keith, Oklahoma
1963-64: Warren Berg, Luther
1962-63: Bob Hartley, Mississippi State
1961-62: John Cox, Navy
1960-61: Marty Reisch, Air Force
1959-60: Wilbur Evans, Southwest Athletic Conference
1958-59: Fred Stabley Sr., Michigan State
1957-58: Ted Mann, Duke

Conventions 
The following is a listing of past and future convention sites, including membership and attendance:

See also
National Association of Collegiate Directors of Athletics

Notes

External links
College Sports Communicators (CSC) official website

Professional associations based in the United States
College sports administrator and coach organizations in the United States
Sports organizations established in 1957